Harakat Ansar Iran (Movement of the Partisans of Iran) was a Sunni militant organization active from 2012 to 2013 in the Sistan and Baluchestan insurgency. It is a designated terrorist organization by Iran and Japan. It was one of two militant groups, along with its ally Jaish ul-Adl, which split from Jundallah after the arrest of its leader in 2010.

Harakat Ansar was initially led by Mohammad Shafi who was killed in Pakistan. After his death, Hesham Azizi a.k.a. Abu Hafs al Baloochi became the leader.
According to Mashregh News, the group received support from  Saudi Arabia and the Taliban.

The group later dropped "Iran" from their name, calling themselves Harakat al-Ansar, which uses Arabic rather than the former Persian name. The group merged with Hizbul-Furqan and formed Ansar Al-Furqan in late 2013.

References

Islamism in Iran
Militant opposition to the Islamic Republic of Iran
Organisations designated as terrorist by Iran
Salafi Islamist groups
Sunni Islamist groups
Organisations designated as terrorist by Japan
Organizations established in 2012
Organizations disestablished in 2013